Borj-e Aqa (also Romanized as Borj-e Āqā) is a village in Miyan Dasht Rural District, in the Central District of Jajrom County, North Khorasan Province, Iran. At the 2006 census, its population was 26, in 7 families.

References 

Populated places in Jajrom County